Raphael Abramovitch Rein (1880–1963), best known as Raphael Abramovitch, was a Russian socialist, a member of the General Jewish Workers' Union in Lithuania, Poland and Russia (Bund), and a leader of the Menshevik wing of the Russian Social-Democratic Workers' Party (RSDRP).

Abramovitch emigrated from Soviet Russia in 1920, landing in Berlin, where he was a co-founder of the long-running Menshevik journal Sotsialisticheskii vestnik (The Socialist Courier). After 1940, with the rise of fascism in Europe, he made his way to the United States, where he lived his final years.

Biography

Early years

Raphael Abramovich Rein was born in Daugavpils (Dvinsk) in January 1880 (December 1879 old style). As a student at Riga Polytechnic he became involved in revolutionary politics and became a convinced Marxist.

Revolutionary activity

In 1901 he joined the Bund and the Russian Social Democratic Labour Party (RSDRP). After being arrested, he emigrated, and worked with the Bund abroad.  When the Bund withdrew from the RSDRP in 1903, Abramovich maintained contact with Menshevik leaders Martov and Fyodor Dan. The Bund and the Mensheviks eventually patched up their differences, and Abramovich became a member of the Menshevik party. He edited the Social-Democratic journals Evreiskii Rabochii (Jewish Workers) and Nashe Slovo (Our Word). In 1904 Abramovich became a member of the Central Committee of the Bund. During the abortive Revolution of 1905, he represented the Bund in the St. Petersburg Soviet. In 1907 he ran unsuccessfully as a candidate for the second Duma. He attended the conferences of the Bund and the RSDRP in 1906 and 1907. In 1911 he was arrested and exiled to Vologda but fled abroad. In 1912–14, he lived in Vienna, working as a correspondent for the Bund newspapers, Leben Frage and Tseit. published legally in Warsaw and St Petersburg.

In 1914 he at first sided with the Internationalist wing of the Menshevik party, which opposed the First World War, but he was not as radically anti-war as Martov. After the February Revolution of 1917, Abramovich returned to Russia. He became a member of the Central Committee of the Petrograd Soviet. For a while he became a qualified Revolutionary Defencist, siding with Mensheviks like Dan and Tsereteli against Martov. While Martov's Menshevik Internationalists opposed the war altogether, the Revolutionary Defencists supported a limited war effort in defence of the Revolution. However, they opposed territorial or financial war aims and rejected the unqualified pro-war stance of 'Social Patriots' like the aged Plekhanov and A.N. Potresov.

Russian revolution

After the October Revolution, Abramovich and Dan once more moved to the left and rejoined Martov's faction. Abramovich played a role in unsuccessful attempts to negotiate and all-socialist coalition with the Bolsheviks, comprising Bolsheviks, Mensheviks, Socialist-Revolutionaries of various factions and Popular Socialists. Neither Lenin nor most of the leaders of the other proposed coalition partners had any interest in this idea, though there was popular support for it among workers. The negotiations failed. Abramovich subsequently became more critical of the Bolsheviks. In 1918 he was arrested for anti-Soviet activities and escaped execution due to the intervention of Friedrich Adler and other foreign socialists. At the 12th Bund Congress, he fiercely opposed a proposal by some of those present to amalgamate with the communist party,

Exile

In 1920 Abramovich left Soviet Russia. He settled in Berlin, where he co-founded and co-edited the Menshevik paper Sotsialisticheskii Vestnik (Socialist Courier). In the 1920s he was involved in organising the Vienna-based International Working Union of Socialist Parties, which united non-communist socialist parties that rejected the 'Social Patriot' leadership of the old Second International but refused to join the communist Third International. He was later included in the executive of the Labour and Socialist International. Abramovich was also instrumental in maintaining contact between Mensheviks abroad and their comrades in Russia. He helped mobilise Western socialist and labour support for socialists persecuted by the Soviet government, e.g. during the Trial of the Socialist Revolutionaries in 1922 and the Menshevik Trial in 1931.

After the rise of Hitler, Abramovich moved to Paris. In 1940, when the Germans invaded France, he fled to the United States. He mainly lived in New York. He was a contributor to the Yiddish Social-Democratic paper Forwerts (Forward). Abramovich wrote his memoirs in Yiddish and an English-language history of the Russian Revolution. He remained heavily involved in the activities of the Menshevik party in exile. In later years he opposed Fyodor Dan's position that Soviet Russia, for all its flaws, was the country 'building socialism' and must be supported, and denounced Soviet totalitarianism. In 1949 he was one of the founders of the Union for the Liberation of the Peoples of Russia.

Death and legacy

Raphael Abramovich was the father of the journalist Mark Rein, who was kidnapped in Spain in 1937, presumably by the OGPU (Soviet secret service). Rein is thought to have been murdered.

Footnotes

Works 

 Der Terror gegen die sozialistischen Parteien in Russland und Georgien. With I. Tsereteli and V. Suchomlin. Berlin, 1925.
 Wandlungen der bolschewistischen Diktatur. Berlin, 1931.
 The Soviet Revolution, 1917-1939. New York: International Universities Press, 1962.

Further reading

 Brovkin, Vladimir, Dear Comrades: Menshevik Reports on the Bolshevik Revolution and the Civil War. Stanford, CA: Hoover Institution Press, 1991.
 Burbank, Jane, Intelligentsia and Revolution: Russian Views of Bolshevism, 1917-1922. New York: Oxford University Press, 1989.
 Liebich, André, From the Other Shore: Russian Social Democracy after 1921. Cambridge, MA: Harvard University Press, 1997.
 Michels, Tony, "The Abramovitch Campaign and What It Tells Us about American Communism," American Communist History, vol. 15, no. 3 (Dec. 2016), pp. 283–292.
 Shukman, Harold (ed), The Blackwell Encyclopedia of the Russian Revolution. Blackwell, 1988.

External links
 

1880 births
1963 deaths
Writers from Daugavpils
People from Dvinsky Uyezd
19th-century Latvian Jews
Bundists
Mensheviks
People of the Russian Revolution
Russian Social Democratic Labour Party members